Determinable may refer to:

 Fee simple, an estate in land, a form of freehold ownership
 Property (philosophy), an attribute of an object

See also
 Determiner
 Determine (horse)